Preferential concentration is the tendency of dense particles in a turbulent fluid to cluster in regions of high strain (low vorticity) due to their inertia. Particles with  follow fluid streamlines and particles with  do not respond significantly to the fluid within the times the fluid motions are coherent.

Systems that can be strongly influenced by the dynamics of preferential concentration are aerosol production of fine powders, spray, emulsifier, and crystallization reactors, pneumatic devices, cloud droplet formation, aerosol transport in the upper atmosphere, and even planet formation from protoplanetary nebula.

External links
 

Turbulence